The Europe and Africa Zone is one of the three zones of regional Davis Cup competition in 2015.

Participating teams

Seeds:
 
 
 
 
 
 
 
 

Remaining nations:

Draw 

 and  promoted to Group I in 2016.

First round

Turkey vs. South Africa

Ireland vs. Belarus

Portugal vs. Morocco

Monaco vs. Finland

Zimbabwe vs. Bosnia and Herzegovina

Hungary vs. Moldova

Luxembourg vs. Madagascar

Latvia vs. Bulgaria

Second round

Turkey vs. Belarus

Portugal vs. Finland

Hungary vs. Bosnia and Herzegovina

Luxembourg vs. Bulgaria

Play-offs

South Africa vs. Ireland

Monaco vs. Morocco

Zimbabwe vs. Moldova

Latvia vs. Madagascar

Third round

Portugal vs. Belarus

Bulgaria vs. Hungary

References
 Draw

Europe Africa Zone II
Davis Cup Europe/Africa Zone